'A Canção da Saudade' is a 1964 Portuguese black-and-white film. The filming took place in a studio at Tóbis Portuguesa, Lisbon and Produções Cinematográficas Perdigão Queiroga. The film reel is 2630 m in length. A Spanish-language film of the same story, which shared the same producers and cast and crew members, was made called Los gatos negros and directed by José Luis Monter.

Plot
A father and son get into conflict because of their different musical styles.

Cast
Vítor Gomes (actor) - Tony, a singer
Florbela Queirós - Cilinha (as Florbela)
Américo Coimbra - Raúl
Ismael Merlo - Leonel
Soledad Miranda - Babá 
Luís Cerqueira - (as Luiz Cerqueira)
Clara Rocha -
José Manuel Simões -
Carlos Queirós (actor) - (as Carlos Queiroz)
Ruy Furtado - (as Rui Furtado)
Nicolau Breyner -
Alberto Ghira -
Fernando Frias -
Lucía Martos -
Aníbal Tapadinhas -
Lídia Franco -
José Orjas -
 Carlos Rodrigues -
Jorge Alves (actor) -
Alberto Ribeiro - Himself - a singer
Alice Amaro - Herself - a singer
Tony De Matos - Himself - a singer
Simone de Oliveira - Herself - a singer
Madalena Iglésias - Herself - a singer (as Madalena)
Mara Abrantes - Herself - a singer
Saudade dos Santos - Herself - a singer
Rosário San Martin -
Jorge Fontes -

External links

 (Portuguese)
 (Portuguese)

1964 musical films
1964 films
Portuguese black-and-white films
Portuguese musical films
1960s Portuguese-language films